Jacques Sabon (born in Lyon, 1535; died in Frankfurt-am-Main, ca.1580-1590) was a French typefounder. He worked with Christian Egenolff in Frankfurt in 1555 and Christophe Plantin of Antwerp in 1565. He is associated with the forms of roman type which were being developed by Claude Garamond and others. On Garamond's death, Plantin and Sabon acquired much of his collection of type, and it is sometimes unclear which were Sabon's own design, and which Garamond's.

After Sabon's death, his widow married Frankfurt printer Konrad Berner. The Sabon typeface, designed in the 1960s by Jan Tschichold, is based on a specimen printed by Berner.

Notes

External links
 JACQUES SABON (1535–1590)

1535 births
16th-century deaths
Businesspeople from Lyon
French typographers and type designers